Quispamsis (sometimes shortened to ) is a Kings County suburb of Saint John, New Brunswick, Canada. Its population was 18,768 as of the 2021 census.

History

The original inhabitants of the area were the Maliseet First Nation, part of the Wabenaki Confederacy.  JP, The name, "Quispamsis" was translated from the Maliseet language and means, "little lake in the woods", the lake being present-day Ritchie Lake.  Acadians, British pre-Loyalists and Loyalists settled in the area around 1783, with many receiving land grants along the Kennebecasis and Hammond Rivers.

Amalgamation 
Following the December 1992 release of a government discussion paper entitled "Strengthening Municipal Government in New Brunswick's Urban Centres", a series of localized feasibility studies were commissioned by the Frank McKenna's Liberals targeting six geographic areas: Edmunston, Campbellton, Dalhousie, Miramichi, Moncton, and Saint John. In each instance, a panel composed of local representatives and expert consulting staff made specific recommendations for each urban-centred region. The report for the Greater Saint John area, "A Community of Communities: Creating a stronger future" - often referred to simply as the Cormier Report - offered two potential solutions to the Province for consolidating the many municipalities in Greater Saint John, neither of which was ultimately adopted by government.

Option one offered by the Cormier Report was to create three communities with regionalization of some services. Under this option, the six Kennebecasis Valley communities (East Riverside-Kinghurst, Fairvale, Gondola Point, Quispamsis, Renforth, and Rothesay) plus the local service district of the Parish of Rothesay would be consolidated into one new municipality. The Town of Grand Bay and various unincorporated areas around Saint John would also be consolidated into the City of Saint John to form the second new municipality. The third municipality in this scenario would be Westfield, which would remain separate because it was more rural and less populated. In this scenario, many services including water and sewerage, planning, and economic development would be regionalized across the three municipalities.

The second option offered by Cormier was a full consolidation of eight of the existing communities into one new city. In this scenario, only Westfield would remain a separate municipality. Full consolidation was unpopular among residents outside the City of Saint John. Suburban residents stated generally that they were pleased with their communities as they were and that they liked their lower tax rates. As Cormier summarized it, residents "perceive Saint John as an expensive, poorly managed bureaucracy that does not serve its citizens well. They fear loss of control, loss of services, and loss of neighbourhood friendliness and sense of community." Suburban residents' comments at public meetings support this description. One Fairvale resident stated that he resented the questionnaire Commissioner Cormier had circulated to residents that asked them to rank their order of preference for his five reorganization schemes because it meant that the worst that full amalgamation could do is fifth place. As the resident put it, "full amalgamation into one city would come about three million, nine hundred and fifty-sixth on anybody's choice. That would come just above amalgamation with Red China."

Ultimately, neither of the two options was implemented. Rather, the provincial government chose to proceed with partial consolidations and opted to legislate cost sharing for five specific regional facilities. Quispamsis amalgamated on January 1, 1998 with the nearby communities of Gondola Point and Wells to form the present town, covering an area of 60 km² and bordering the town of Rothesay to the southwest with the Hammond River along its northeastern boundary.

Occasional discussion about the possibility of further amalgamating Rothesay with Quispamsis has not proceeded beyond the discussion phase, though the two municipalities do collaborate extensively to share services and facilities. Notably, both towns' boundaries were also left largely unaltered by the 2023 New Brunswick local governance reform.

Demographics 

Parks

There are a number of recreational parks in the area. Parks open at dawn and closed at dusk. Parks include:

Arts and Culture Park (12 Landing Court) – includes walking trails, WiFi, picnic/chess tables, benches, stage and mezzanine. During the summer months there are outdoor movies and music free of charge and ice skating during the winter months.

Hammond River Park (28 Reynar Drive) – includes 40 acres, a fire pit, barbecue, picnic tables, hiking trails and a log cabin which is available for rent.

Off Leash Park (222 Vincent Road) – fenced-in area, trails and benches. This is an area for dog owners to let their dog run free.

Meenan's Cove Park (199 Model Farm Road) – includes picnic tables, barbecues, beach, boat dock, playground, ball field, walking trails and beach volleyball courts.

Ritchie Lake Park (Cedar Grove Drive) – includes picnic tables, beach and walking trails.

Quispamsis Qplex (20 Randy Jones Way) - includes two soccer fields, a baseball field, tennis courts, an arena, a swimming pool and a playground as well as many varied walking trails.

Gondola Point Beach - Gondola Point Beach is a supervised freshwater beach with changing rooms and picnic areas. It is situated on a sandbar overlooking the Kennebecasis River at the entrance to the Gondola Point Cable Ferry service in Quispamsis. In the summer of 2014 there was a section on the beach fenced off for a "dog beach".

Transport
The Gondola Point Ferry, linking Quispamsis with the Kingston Peninsula, was originally installed by William Pitt and is the first underwater cable ferry in the world.

The COMEX bus service run by Saint John Transit runs through the Kennebecasis Valley and shuttles commuters from Quispamsis to Saint John every day, Mondays to Fridays. There are a few "park and ride" locations for commuters to leave their car for the day to take the bus into Saint John and along with other standing bus stops along the way.

Education
Quispamsis has a number of schools from grades K-12, these schools are:

Notable people
Randy Jones - Canadian former professional ice hockey player who played eight seasons in the National Hockey League (NHL) with the Philadelphia Flyers, Los Angeles Kings, Tampa Bay Lightning and Winnipeg Jets.

See also
List of communities in New Brunswick

Notes

References

External links

 Town of Quispamsis

Communities in Kings County, New Brunswick
Towns in New Brunswick
Communities in Greater Saint John